Dornbush is a surname. Notable people with the surname include:

K. Terry Dornbush (born 1933), former United States Ambassador to the Netherlands
Richard Dornbush (born 1991), American figure skater